Jean-Nicolas Gannal, (27 July 1791, Saarlouis – 13 January 1852, Paris) was a pharmacist, chemist, and inventor.

Biography
Gannal began his career as a pharmacist's apprentice. From 1808 to 1812 he was in the medical corps of the French army. He was at Metz, Hannover, and Lübeck. In 1812, because he spoke fluent German, he was assigned to Marshal Davout's headquarters as an interpreter. Gannal was captured by the Russians on 10 December 1812 and interned at Vilnius. He escaped and returned to French headquarters in Dresden on 19 June 1813 and was then redeployed. Gannal claimed to have been captured seven times in 18 months, the last time by the Austrians. He returned from captivity to Paris on 5 October 1815. After demobilization, he jointed the chemical laboratory at l'École polytechnique, where he remained until 1818. He was an assistant preparator (préparateur adjoint) to Gay-Lussac and Thénard. He worked for the chemical laboratory of the Académie des Sciences.

Gannal then developed methods for industry and went into business for himself.

He published his book Histoire des Embaumements in 1838. This work was translated into English in 1840 and was the basis for establishing the embalming method called in the U.S.A. the Gannal process ("procédé Gannal").

He married Theresia Demar; among their children were two physician-pharmacists. Jean-Nicolas Gannal was succeeded in his embalming business by a son and a grandson. In 1903, their company embalmed the body of Elie Faure, the famous historian of art. According to the company's records, the Gannal process was used to embalm the bodies of Hortense Schneider, Anna de Noailles, Paul Doumer, maréchal Joffre and many other celebrities.

Jean-Nicolas Gannal died in Paris on 13 January 1852, at his residence at 6 rue de Seine, and was buried at cimetière du Montparnasse.

See also
 Alfredo Salafia

Bibliography
 Jean-Nicolas Gannal, Histoire des Embaumements et de la préparation des pièces d'anatomie normale 1838 : l'édition de 1841 est librement consultable sur Googlebooks.

References

19th-century French chemists
Embalmers
1791 births
1852 deaths
People from Saarlouis
Burials at Montparnasse Cemetery